Wheelock or Wheelocke is an English surname and given name. It is derived from the Old Welsh (or possibly Ancient British Celtic) ancestor of the Welsh word chevel-og, meaning 'winding river' (see River Wheelock). The name may refer to:

People

Surname 
 Abraham Wheelocke (1593–1653), English scholar and librarian
 Arthur K. Wheelock Jr., American art expert
 Cyrus H. Wheelock (1813–1894), American religious leader
 Dennison Wheelock (1871–1927), American musician
 Dora V. Wheelock (1847–1923), American activist and writer
 Douglas H. Wheelock (born 1960), American astronaut
 Eleazar Wheelock (1711–1779), American educator and college founder
 Frank E. Wheelock (1863–1932), American businessman and politician
 Frederic M. Wheelock (1902–1987), American scholar and writer
 Jaime Wheelock (born 1946), Nicaraguan politician
 Jerome Wheelock (1834–1902), American inventor
 Jerome H. Wheelock (1877–1966), American educator and politician
 Jerry Wheelock (1784–1861), American businessman
 John Wheelock (1754–1817), American college president
 John Hall Wheelock (1886–1978), American poet
 Karla Wheelock (born 1968), Mexican mountain climber and writer
 Lucy Wheelock (1857–1946), American educator and college founder
 Merrill G. Wheelock (1822–1866), American artist and architect
 Ralph Wheelock (1600–1683), American teacher
 Sean Wheelock (born 1974), American sports commentator
 Simeon Wheelock (1741–1786), American militiaman

First name 
 Wheelock G. Veazey (1835–1898), American lawyer and judge
 Wheelock Whitney, Sr. (1894–1957), American businessman
 Wheelock Whitney, Jr. (1926–2016), American businessman and politician
 Wheelock Whitney III (born 1949), American art collector

See also 
 Wheelock (disambiguation)